Thomas Robins the Elder (1715/16–1770) was an English artist known for his depictions of English country houses and their gardens. His work has particular historical value as he documented many Rococo gardens that have since disappeared.

In 1748, Robins painted the Rococo garden at Painswick House that had been created by Benjamin Hyett II. Hugh Hammersley's rococo gardens at Woodside in Berkshire were captured in three paintings by Robins.

His son, Thomas Robins the Younger (1748–1806), followed his father in his style of work.

References

Further reading
Harris, John. (1976) Gardens of Delight: The Art of Thomas Robins. London: Royal Institute of British Architects.
Harris, John. (1978) Gardens of Delight: The Rococo English Landscape of Thomas Robins the Elder. Basilisk Press.

External links 

1710s births
1770 deaths
18th-century English painters
English landscape artists
Garden design history of England
People from Cheltenham